Until the twentieth century, there were three thousand people within the Kırklareli Jewish congregation. However, during the 1934 Thrace Pogroms, most Jews fled the city. The synagogue of the city is still active and in 2008 there were only 5 Jewish residents left in the city of Thrace, including a rabbi. Most of these remaining persons are around the age of 80 or over. Rabbi Hayim Abravanel (85), his wife Victoria Abravanel (76) and Yasua Kaneti (80). The youngest members of the community are Penhas (58) and Rozi (50) Haleva. The Synagogue has been standing for 50 years.

References

Further reading 
Once upon a Time Jews Lived in Kirklareli Erol Haker

History of Kırklareli Province
Historic Jewish communities
Geography of Kırklareli Province
Jewish communities in Turkey